Réda Abdenouz (born 25 September 1968 in Hussein Dey, Algiers Province) is a retired Algerian middle distance runner who specialized in the 800 metres. He was a finalist at the 1992 Summer Olympics. He was twice a medallist at the Mediterranean Games and represented his country at two editions of the World Championships in Athletics.

International competitions

Personal bests 
800 metres - 1:44.98 min (1993)
1500 metres - 3:38.94 min (1993)

References

External links

1968 births
Living people
People from Hussein Dey (commune)
Algerian male middle-distance runners
Olympic athletes of Algeria
Athletes (track and field) at the 1988 Summer Olympics
Athletes (track and field) at the 1992 Summer Olympics
World Athletics Championships athletes for Algeria
Mediterranean Games gold medalists for Algeria
Mediterranean Games bronze medalists for Algeria
Mediterranean Games medalists in athletics
Athletes (track and field) at the 1991 Mediterranean Games
Athletes (track and field) at the 1993 Mediterranean Games
21st-century Algerian people